Empress Fu the Younger may refer to:

Fu Xunying (died 407), empress of the Later Yan dynasty, also known as Empress Fu the Younger (小苻皇后)
Empress Dowager Fu (Later Zhou) (932–993), empress of the Later Zhou dynasty, also known as Empress Fu the Younger (小符皇后)

See also
Empress Fu (disambiguation)